The Boston Weekly Advertiser (1757–1775), also called The Boston Post-Boy & Advertiser was a weekly newspaper published in Boston, Massachusetts by John Green (1727–1787) and Joseph Russell (1734–1795).  

The paper "loyally sustained the British Government" during the American Revolution.

Nathaniel Mills and John Hicks published the paper in its final years, 1773–1775.

Varying titles 
 The Boston Weekly Advertiser.  Aug. 22, 1757- Dec. 25, 1758.
 Green & Russell's Boston Post-boy & Advertiser.  Jan. 1, 1759-May 23, 1763.
 The Boston Post-Boy & Advertiser.  May 30, 1763- Sept. 25, 1769.
 The Massachusetts Gazette, and the Boston Post-Boy and Advertiser. Oct. 2, 1769-Apr. 17, 1775.

See also
 Boston Post-Boy, published 1834-1854

References 

1775 disestablishments in the Thirteen Colonies
18th century in Boston
Defunct newspapers published in Massachusetts
Newspapers published in Boston
Publications established in 1757